Nicholas L. Hubbard (May 8, 1895 – January 4, 1983) was an American politician, farmer, and businessman.

Hubbard was born in Mount Pulaski, Illinois. He went to the Mount Pulaski Public Schools and graduated from Illinois State University. Hubbard served in the United States Army during World War I and was commissioned a second lieutenant. He taught school in Mount Pulaski and was a farmer. He was involved with the grain elevator business and was the owner of the Mount Pulaski Grain Company. Hubbard served in the Illinois House of Representatives from 1935 to 1941 and in the Illinois Senate from 1941 to 1945. Hubbard was a Democrat. Hubbard died at the Abraham Lincoln Hospital in Lincoln, Illinois.

Notes

1895 births
1983 deaths
People from Logan County, Illinois
Military personnel from Illinois
Illinois State University alumni
Businesspeople from Illinois
Farmers from Illinois
Schoolteachers from Illinois
Democratic Party members of the Illinois House of Representatives
Democratic Party Illinois state senators
20th-century American politicians
20th-century American businesspeople